Karl Vilhelm Zetterstéen (18 August 1866 – June 1, 1953) was a Swedish professor and orientalist.

Biography
Zetterstéen was born at Orsa in Dalarna, Sweden. He began his studies at Uppsala University in 1884, became a Ph.D. and docent of Semitic languages in 1895. He also studied under  professor  Eduard Sachau (1845–1930) at the University of Berlin. He was acting professor of Oriental languages at Lund University 1895-1904 and professor of Semitic languages in Uppsala 1904–1931.  He became emeritus 1931.

As a semitist, Zetterstéen was foremost an Arabic philologist, but he was also well-oriented in non-Semitic languages such as Persian, Turkish and Nubian. Beside a large number of text editions and studies, he published a Swedish translation of the Qur'an and wrote several articles in the Nordisk familjebok as well as a number of popular works.
,

Translations & Editions  

 Qur'an (Stockholm, 1917)

 Shams al-'ulum wa-dawa' kalam al-'Arab min al- kulum  (‘The sun of Wisdom and Remedy for the Arabic Language's Lesions’) by Nashwān ibn Saʻīd al-Ḥimyarī*

References

Swedish philologists
Arabists
Linguists from Sweden
1866 births
1953 deaths
People from Dalarna
Uppsala University alumni
Lund University alumni
Quran translators
Swedish orientalists
Academic staff of Lund University
Academic staff of Uppsala University
Members of the Royal Society of Sciences in Uppsala